Vella Eacharan (9 July 1918 – 11 February 1980) was an Indian politician from Kerala and a member of the Indian National Congress.He was elected to 1st Lok Sabha in 1952 and 2nd Lok Sabha in 1962. Eacharan was the Minister for Devaswom, Harijan welfare, Community Development, Colonization & Settlement (1971-1977). He was elected to Kerala Legislative Assembly from Thrithala in 1970 and Wandoor in 1977.

Personal life
Vella Eacharan was born at Alathur on July 9, 1918 as the son of Vella. In 1943, he married Lekshmi and they have three daughters.

Political life
After school education and co-operative training from Co-operative Institute, Madras, he was in Government service (Clerk in Civil Supplies) during 1943-1951. However, he left Government service and entered politics as an active worker of the INC. Actively involved in harijan upliftment and Bhoodan work, Eacharan later served as a member of the First Lok Sabha and Second Lok Sabha. At the age of 33 , Eacharan was elected to the first Lok Sabha in 1952 .
 
Eacharan was subsequently elected to Kerala Legislative Assembly from Trithala constituency in 1970 and from Wandoor constituency in 1977.
 
Eacharan was the Minister for Devaswoms, Harijan Welfare,  Community Development, Colonization and Settlement from 25.9.1971 to 25.3.1977, in the Ministry headed by Shri. C. Achutha Menon.

The landmark initiative of Special Recruitment for Scheduled Castes and Scheduled Tribes in Kerala Government service was started by Vella Eacharan in 1972.

During his tenure as Devaswom minister (1971–77), Eacharan introduced bills like The Guruvayoor Devaswom Bill,1971 and The Koodalmanickam Devaswom Bill, 1971 and The Travancore–Cochin Hindu Religious Institutions (Amendment) Bill,1974.
Another major bill introduced by Vella Eacharan was the Bonded Labour System (Abolition) Bill , 1975.
He was the Founder of Nayanar Memorial Harijan Hostel, Alathur.
He had also held several high positions in different walks of life including serving as

 Member of the Select Committee,
The Representation of the people (amendment) bill, 1958
 Member of the Joint Committee,
The Dowry Prohibition Bill, 1959 
 Member , Estimates Committee, Lok Sabha (1961–62)
 President of Depressed Class League, Malabar
 All India (CWC) Congress Working Committee member
 All India Congress Committee (AICC) member
 Kerala Pradesh Congress Committee (KPCC) member
 President of Palghat Harijan Sabha
 Organiser of Harijan Yuva Jana Vidyalayam
 Member of Indian Central Arecanut Committee as also its representative on the Indian Council of Agricultural Research (ICAR) and its Advisory Board
 Member of Area Committee, Hindu Religious and Charitable Endowments, North Malabar      
 Member of Malabar Harijan Sewak Sangh.

Death
Vella Eacharan died on 11 February 1980 and the Kerala State Legislative Assembly paid its homage to him on 18 February 1980.

References 

Indian National Congress politicians from Kerala
Kerala MLAs 1970–1977
1918 births
1980 deaths